Robin Hood and Guy of Gisborne is Child Ballad 118, part of the Percy collection. It introduces and disposes of Guy of Gisborne who remains next to the Sheriff of Nottingham the chief villain of the Robin Hood legend.  This ballad survives in a single seventeenth century copy but has always been recognized as much older in content, possibly older than Robin Hood and the Monk. A play with a similar plot survives in a copy dated to 1475.

This ballad has been much admired, the Oxford Companion to English Literature, 4th edition, describes it as the best of the Robin Hood ballads. But it is also the most often cited, along with Robin Hood and the Monk, for excessive brutality. Guy comes to Barnesdale to capture Robin Hood, but Robin kills and beheads him. Meanwhile, Little John has been captured by the Sheriff, but Robin rescues him by impersonating Guy of Gisborne.

External links
Robin Hood and Guy of Gisborne
ROBIN HOOD AND GUY OF GISBORNE: INTRODUCTION

Child Ballads
Robin Hood ballads